Stocksmoor railway station serves the village of Stocksmoor near Huddersfield in West Yorkshire, England.

Most of the Penistone Line is single track between Huddersfield and Barnsley (and has been since 1989). However, Stocksmoor marks the first point (for Sheffield-bound trains) or last point (for Huddersfield-bound trains) where there is dual running track (the passing loop extends as far south as the next station at Shepley and most trains are scheduled to pass each other on this section).

Facilities

Like the other stations on this route, Stocksmoor is unmanned (and has been so since 1966, when the route was reprieved from closure).  It has shelters on each platform; the old station waiting room on the southbound side still stands, though it is not in rail use.  Train running information is provided by timetable posters and by telephone, though operator Northern is funding the provision of digital display screens here in 2016 as well as Brockholes, Berry Brow and Lockwood.  Step-free access is available to both platforms via ramps from the nearby road.

Services
The Sunday frequency is also hourly, but starts later in the morning.

References

External links

Railway stations in Kirklees
DfT Category F2 stations
Former Lancashire and Yorkshire Railway stations
Northern franchise railway stations
Railway stations in Great Britain opened in 1850
Kirkburton